Lucca Comics & Games is an annual comic book and gaming convention in Lucca, Italy, traditionally held at the end of October, in conjunction with All Saints' Day. It is the largest comics festival in Europe, and the second biggest in the world after the Comiket.

History 

The Salone Internazionale del Comics ("International Congress of Comics") was launched by a Franco-Italian partnership, consisting of Italians Rinaldo Traini and Romano Calisi and Frenchman  (forming the International Congress of Cartoonists and Animators) in 1965 in Bordighera.
In 1966, it moved to a small piazza in the center of Lucca, and grew in size and importance over the years.

Funding issues reduced the frequency of the festival to every two years, beginning in 1977. In the 1980s, the festival was moved to a sports center outside the city walls, where it remained until 1992, when it was moved to another city. (Funding issues also forced the cancellation of the 1988 festival.)

After the Salone internazionale del Comics ended in Lucca, city leaders launched a new convention called simply Lucca Comics that was a reprise of the old one. In 1996, it changed its name to Lucca Comics & Games. The festival attracted 50,000 attendees in 2002.

Meanwhile, the Salone internazionale del Comics was held in Rome from 1995 to 2005. In 2006, for the festival's 40th anniversary, the Salone merged with Lucca Comics & Games and moved back to Lucca's city center, with numerous tents and pavilions arranged in different squares within and outside the walls of the medieval city.

In 2022 the festival sold 319,926 tickets, beating the record established in 2016 when it had attracted 270,000 attendees.

Awards

Comics awards 
From 1970 to 2005, the festival presented the   — named in honor of Richard F. Outcault's seminal comic strip character The Yellow Kid — in such categories as Best Cartoonist, Best Illustrator, Best Newcomer, Best Foreign Artist, and Lifetime Achievement. Yellow Kid Awards were also presented to publishers, both domestic and foreign. 

In 2020, as the festival redubbed itself Lucca Changes amidst a shift to virtual programming during the COVID-19 pandemic, the awards shifted to a new system under the umbrella term Lucca Comics Awards, consisting of 9 categories (3 Yellow Kids, 5 Gran Guinigis, and one Stefano Beani Award named for a former festival director), "regardless of nationality, editorial format or distribution method."

Yellow Kid Award recipients 
 1970: Johnny Hart, for Best Cartoonist of the Year — first time this award was given to an American cartoonist
 1971: Mauricio de Sousa, for Best Cartoonist of the Year. His work, the first edition of Monica's Gang, also won Best Publication.
 1972:
 Hergé, for "una vita per il cartooning" (lifetime award)
 Tintin magazine, for Best Publication
 1973: Guido Buzzelli, for Best Illustrator and Author
 1974: Vaughn Bodé
 1975:
 Jean Giraud, for Best Foreign Artist
 Dan O'Neill
 Frank Hampson, declared Prestigioso Maestro and the best writer and artist of strip cartoons since the end of the Second World War
 1977: Fred
 1978: 
 Bobby London, Best Artist-Writer
 Milo Manara
 Carlos Trillo, for Best International Author
1980: 
 Didier Comès, for Best Foreign Artist
  Jean Giraud, for Best Foreign Author
 Frank Margerin
 1982: Art Spiegelman, for Best Foreign Author
 1983: 
 Gilbert Hernandez
 Jaime Hernandez
 1984: Strip Art Features, for Best Foreign Comics Publisher
 1986: Bill Sienkiewicz, for "bridging the gap between American and European artistic sensibilities" 
 1990: 
 Neil Gaiman
 Massimo Rotundo, for Best Italian Comics Artist
 Leonardo Ortolani, for Best Newcomer
 1993:
 John Byrne
 François Boucq
 Frank Thomas
 Ollie Johnston
 1998: Paul Gillon
 1999: Jeff Smith, Best Author

Gran Guinigi recipients 
 1969: Hugo Pratt, for Una ballata del mare salato
 1975: Dan O'Neill for  The Penny-Ante Republican
 1978: Carlos Trillo
 1986: Bill Sienkiewicz
 1990: Massimo Rotundo
 2001: Aldo Di Gennaro
 2005: Grazia Nidasio
 2006: Gino D'Antonio
 2007: Sergio Toppi
 2008: Vittorio Giardino
 2009: Robert Crumb
 2010: Jirō Taniguchi
 2011: Enrique Breccia
 2012: Hermann Huppen
 2013: Silver (Guido Silvestri)
 2014: Gipi
 2015: Alfredo Castelli
 2016: Albert Uderzo
 2017: José Muñoz
 2018: Leiji Matsumoto
 2019: Chris Claremont

Games awards 
 1999: Murat CELEBI's [skirmish miniature game [CONFRONTATION], for Best of Show.
 2002: Emiliano Sciarra's Wild West-themed card game Bang!, for Best of Show
 2003: Sine Requie, for Best Italian Game
 2004: Helena Bulaja's Priče iz davnine ("Croatian Tales of Long Ago"), for Best Multimedia Award
 2010: 
 7 Wonders, for Best Card Game
 Eden: the Deceit, Side Award for Best Game Mechanics
 2011:
 Vincent Baker's Apocalypse World, for RPG of the Year
 Twilight Struggle, for Best of Show in Boardgame for Experts

References

External links

Comics conventions
Gaming conventions
Multigenre conventions
Lucca
Tourist attractions in Tuscany
Recurring events established in 1965
1965 establishments in Italy